Meintjes is a surname. Notable people with the surname include:

Doug Meintjes (1890–1979), South African cricketer
Henry Meintjes (1892-?), South African flying ace
Johannes Meintjes (1923-1980), South African artist and writer
Laurens Meintjes (1868–1941), South African track cyclist
Louis Meintjes (born 1992), South African cyclist